OWR may stand for:
 Osler–Weber–Rendu disease/syndrome, a genetic disorder associated with abnormal blood vessel formation, see hereditary hemorrhagic telangiectasia;
 Omega West Reactor, an experimental nuclear reactor located at Los Alamos National Laboratory;
 Order of the White Rose of Finland, one of three official orders in Finland;
 OpenWebRTC, a free software stack that implements the WebRTC standard